Paul Mitchell (born 18 December 1968 in Edinburgh) is a Scottish football commentator for BBC Scotland and was their main commentator for a six-year period from 2004 to 2010.

His past co-commentators include Pat Nevin and Ian McCall – Mitchell is currently joined by either Craig Paterson or Billy Dodds when commentating on live matches for BBC Scotland's Sportscene programme.

He started his broadcasting career with the BBC in 1991 as a football reporter, moving into Radio Commentary in 1998. His first television commentary appearance was in February 2001, covering the Scottish Cup. Mitchell has covered 13 major Scottish Finals, seven Scottish Cup Final and six League Cup Finals, and has also commentated on a wide range of domestic, European and international matches. In 2007, he covered the under-20 World Cup Finals in Canada. and he has also appeared on Match of the Day. In addition to television work, he can also be regularly heard on BBC Radio Scotland's Sportsound programmes, providing live commentary of Scottish Premier League, European football and Women's International and Champions League matches. 
 
Away from football, Mitchell is also BBC Scotland's Indoor Bowls commentator; he has provided commentary on the television coverage of the Scottish International Open each year since 2006 and was part of the team that provided commentary on the bowls at the Commonwealth Games in Glasgow in 2014.

In addition he is part of Radio Scotland's Rugby Sportsound team and has provided Radio commentary on the Pro 12/Pro 14, HSBC International 7's, European matches and Scotland International matches. While they held the contract, he also provided English language commentary on BBC Alba's Television coverage of the Pro 12.

He is also Radio Scotland's commentator and presenter for Shinty's premier event Camanachd Cup final covering many finals since 2011, .

Outside sport, he is also a regular contributor to BBC Radio Scotland's Thought for the Day, which is broadcast during Good Morning Scotland on BBC Radio Scotland and has presented music based programmes. Blog

He presented the Greatest Country Hits show on the Bauer City 2 network across Scotland and England in 2016 and 2017

He supports Hearts.

Mitchell also appeared in Nike's Winner Stays commercial in 2014 alongside Zlatan Ibrahimović, Cristiano Ronaldo and Neymar as a commentator.

Mitchell is a fan of the NFL and in particular the New Orleans Saints. In 2018 he started a podcast called NFL Scotland with fellow broadcaster Cameron Hobbs. Since launch, Paul has co-hosted a number of live sold-out events with the podcast in Edinburgh and Glasgow.

References

Living people
1968 births
Entertainers from Edinburgh
Scottish association football commentators